The Ford Fiesta S2000 is a Super 2000 rally car built by M-Sport. It is based upon the Ford Fiesta road car. It made its racing debut at the 78th Rallye Monte Carlo in 2010,  with factory team M-Sport and drivers Mikko Hirvonen and Julien Maurin. Hirvonen won the rally.

SWRC/WRC-2 Victories
{|class="wikitable" style="font-size: 95%; "
! No.
! Event
! Season
! Driver
! Co-driver
|-
|align="right" style="padding-right: 0.5em;"| 1
|  2010 Rally México
|align="center"| 2010
|  Xavier Pons
|  Alex Haro
|-
|align="right" style="padding-right: 0.5em;"| 2
|  2010 Jordan Rally
|align="center"| 2010
|  Xavier Pons
|  Alex Haro
|-
|align="right" style="padding-right: 0.5em;"| 3
|  2010 Rally New Zealand
|align="center"| 2010
|  Jari Ketomaa
|  Mika Stenberg
|-
|align="right" style="padding-right: 0.5em;"| 4
|  2010 Rally de Portugal
|align="center"| 2010
|  Jari Ketomaa
|  Mika Stenberg
|-
|align="right" style="padding-right: 0.5em;"| 5
|  2010 Rally Japan
|align="center"| 2010
|  Jari Ketomaa
|  Mika Stenberg
|-
|align="right" style="padding-right: 0.5em;"| 6
|  2011 Rally México
|align="center"| 2011
|  Martin Prokop
|  Jan Tománek
|-
|align="right" style="padding-right: 0.5em;"| 7
|  2011 Jordan Rally
|align="center"| 2011
|  Bernardo Sousa
|  António Costa
|-
|align="right" style="padding-right: 0.5em;"| 8
|  2011 Rally Italia Sardegna
|align="center"| 2011
|  Ott Tänak
|  Kuldar Sikk
|-
|align="right" style="padding-right: 0.5em;"| 9
|  2011 Rallye Deutschland
|align="center"| 2011
|  Ott Tänak
|  Kuldar Sikk
|-
|align="right" style="padding-right: 0.5em;"| 10
|  2011 Rallye de France-Alsace
|align="center"| 2011
|  Ott Tänak
|  Kuldar Sikk
|-
|align="right" style="padding-right: 0.5em;"| 11
|  2012 Monte Carlo Rally
|align="center"| 2012
|  Craig Breen
|  Gareth Roberts
|-
|align="right" style="padding-right: 0.5em;"| 12
|  2012 Wales Rally GB
|align="center"| 2012
|  Craig Breen
|  Paul Nagle
|-
|align="right" style="padding-right: 0.5em;"| 13
|  2012 Rallye de France-Alsace
|align="center"| 2012
|  Craig Breen
|  Paul Nagle
|-
|align="right" style="padding-right: 0.5em;"| 14
|  2012 Rally Catalunya
|align="center"| 2012
|  Craig Breen
|  Paul Nagle
|-
|align="right" style="padding-right: 0.5em;"| 15
|  2014 Rally Sweden
|align="center"| 2014
|  Karl Kruuda
|  Martin Järveoja
|-
|align="right" style="padding-right: 0.5em;"| 16
|  2014 Rally Finland
|align="center"| 2014
|  Karl Kruuda
|  Martin Järveoja
|}

IRC Victories
{|class="wikitable" style="font-size: 95%; "
! No.
! Event
! Season
! Driver
! Co-driver
|-
|align="right" style="padding-right: 0.5em;"| 1
|  2010 Monte Carlo Rally
|align="center"| 2010
|  Mikko Hirvonen
|  Jarmo Lehtinen
|-
|align="right" style="padding-right: 0.5em;"| 2
|  2010 Cyprus Rally
|align="center"| 2010
|  Nasser Al-Attiyah
|  Giovanni Bernacchini
|-
|align="right" style="padding-right: 0.5em;"| 3
|  2012 Prime Yalta Rally
|align="center"| 2012
|  Yağız Avcı
|  Bahadır Gücenmez
|-
|}

Gallery

External links

 The official website of the Ford Fiesta S2000
 Rally results of Ford Fiesta S2000

Super 2000 cars
S2000